Fintry is a small community in British Columbia, Canada. It has about 50 homes and is at the bottom of a three kilometre steep windy road off West Side Road. There are a few public beaches as well as a provincial campground.

Shorts Creek, once known as the Elk River and Rivière à la Biche, is a medium sized stream that runs through the middle of the community.  The creek is named after Captain Thomas Dolman Shorts, a ship captain for the Canadian Pacific Railway Lake and River Service steamboats on Okanagan Lake who was the first non-native to land at the creek and the surrounding area.  Fintry Falls, accessed via a steep stairway, is located in a small canyon where Shorts Creek drops into the town toward the lake.

See also
Fintry Provincial Park

References

External links
Fintry Map

Unincorporated settlements in British Columbia
Populated places in the Regional District of Central Okanagan
Populated places on Okanagan Lake
Populated places in the Okanagan Country